RP Mall may refer to, 

 RP Mall, Kollam - A 7 floor Shopping Mall in the city of Kollam, India
 RP Mall, Kozhikode - A shopping Mall located at the city of Kozhikode, India